Megachile pugnata is a species of North American bee in the family Megachilidae. It was described by Thomas Say in 1837.

Females are 12–18 mm in length while male are somewhat smaller: 11–13 mm. The adults are active from June to September.

Females of this species are oligolectic on the pollen of plants in the sunflower family, Asteraceae, and commonly visit ironweeds (e.g. Vernonia fasciculata) for nectar.

References

pugnata
Insects described in 1837